The Discocephalinae are a subfamily of shield bugs, erected by Fieber in 1860, and found worldwide.

Tribes and genera
BioLib lists the following genera in two tribes:

Discocephalini
Auth.: Fieber, 1860

 †Acanthocephalonotum Petrulevičius & Popov, 2014
 Abascantus (insect) Stål, 1864
 Ablaptus Stål, 1864
 Acclivilamna Ruckes, 1966
 Agaclitus Stål, 1864
 Alcippus Stål, 1867
 Allinocoris Ruckes, 1966
 Alveostethus Ruckes, 1966
 Anhanga Distant, 1887
 Antiteuchus Dallas, 1851
 Braunus Distant, 1899
 Callostethus Ruckes, 1961
 Cataulax Spinola, 1837
 Colpocarena Stål, 1868
 Dinocoris Burmeister, 1835
 Discocephala Laporte, 1833
 Discocephalessa Kirkaldy, 1909
 Dryptocephala Laporte, 1833
 Eurystethus Mayr, 1864
 Glyphuchus Stål, 1860
 Grassator Ruckes, 1965
 Harpagogaster Kormilev, 1957
 Ischnopelta Stål, 1868
 Lineostethus Ruckes, 1966
 Mecistorhinus Dallas, 1851
 Oncodochilus Fieber, 1851
 Opophylax Bergroth, 1918
 Pandonotum Ruckes, 1965
 Paralcippus Becker & Grazia, 1986
 Parantiteuchus Ruckes, 1962
 Parvamima Ruckes, 1960
 Patronatus Ruckes, 1965
 Pelidnocoris Stål, 1867
 Phineus (insect) Stål, 1862
 Phoeacia Stål, 1862
 Placidocoris Ruckes, 1965
 Platycarenus Fieber, 1860
 Priapismus Distant, 1889
 Psorus Bergroth, 1914
 Ruckesiocoris Rider, 1998
 Sachana Amyot & Serville, 1843
 Sympiezorhincus Spinola, 1837
 Tetragonotum Ruckes, 1965
 Uncinala Ruckes, 1965
 Unicrus Ruckes, 1966

Ochlerini
Auth.: Rolston, 1981

 Adoxoplatys Breddin, 1903
 Alathetus Dallas, 1851
 Alitocoris Sailer, 1950
 Barola Rolston, 1992
 Brachelytron Ruckes, 1958
 Catulona Rolston, 1992
 Clypona Rolston, 1992
 Coranda Rolston, 1992
 Cromata Ruckes, 1992
 Eritrachys Ruckes, 1959
 Forstona Rolston, 1992
 Herrichella Distant, 1911
 Hondocoris Thomas, 2004
 Lincus Stål, 1867
 Macropygium Spinola, 1837
 Melambyrsus Breddin, 1912
 Miopygium Breddin, 1904
 Moncus Stål, 1867
 Neoadoxoplatys Kormilev, 1956
 Ocellatocoris Campos & Grazia, 2001
 Ochlerus Spinola, 1837
 Orbatina Ruckes, 1960
 Paralincus Distant, 1911
 Parochlerus Breddin, 1904
 Phereclus (insect) Stål, 1862
 Pseudadoxoplatys Rolston, 1992
 Schaefferella Spinola, 1850
 Schraderiellus Rider, 1998
 Similiforstona Campos & Grazia, 2000
 Stalius Rolston, 1992
 Tetrochlerus Breddin, 1904
 Uvaldus Rolston, 1992

Unplaced genera
 Nigrisagitta Rosso & Campos
 Parastalius Matesco, Grazia & Campos, 2007
 Stapecolis Garbelotto & Campos, 2016
 Xynocoris Garbelotto & Campos, 2014

References

External links
 
 

Pentatomidae
Hemiptera subfamilies
Shield bugs